Miguel Ángel Pantó (born November 26, 1912, date of death unknown) was an Argentine professional football player. He was born in Buenos Aires and also held Italian citizenship.

He played for 5 seasons in the Serie A for A.S. Roma (129 games, 41 goal), winning the championship in the 1941/42 season. He was among the top 10 goalscorers of the 1939–40 Serie A with 10 goals.

References

1912 births
Year of death missing
Argentine footballers
Argentine Primera División players
Club Atlético Platense footballers
San Lorenzo de Almagro footballers
Serie A players
A.S. Roma players
Association football midfielders
Footballers from Buenos Aires